Cunninyeuk is a locality in the Murray River Council, New South Wales, Australia.

Geography

Heritage listings
Gee Gee Bridge was a heritage-listed bridge on Nooroon Road over the Wakool River connecting Cunninyeuk with neighbouring Wetuppa. However it was delisted from the heritage register on 2 March 2018 to allow a new bridge to be built to replace it as part of the Roads & Maritime Services Timber Truss Bridge Strategy. Work commenced in September 2018 with the new bridge opening in May 2020.

References

Towns in the Riverina
Towns in New South Wales
Murray River Council